The NER Class C was a class of 171 two-cylinder steam locomotives of the 0-6-0 wheel arrangement built between 1886 and 1894 for the North Eastern Railway. 
These engines were designed to fill NER's need for goods engines; however, issues with reliability and fuel consumption led to all 171 being rebuilt to the simpler Class C1 type between 1901 and 1913.

References 

C
C
Railway locomotives introduced in 1886
Scrapped locomotives
Standard gauge steam locomotives of Great Britain

Freight locomotives